33Miles is the self-titled debut studio album from Christian rock band 33Miles. It was released on April 10, 2007 on INO Records.

Track listing 

A bonus disc was available for anyone who bought the album in advance.

Chart positions 
The album reached No. 16 on the Top Christian Albums chart, and No. 8 on the Top Heatseekers chart.

References 

2007 debut albums
33Miles albums
INO Records albums